Kidnapped is a 1986 Australian animated historical drama film directed by Geoff Collins. The film is based on the 1886 novel Kidnapped by author Robert Louis Stevenson.

A region free collectors edition of the film was released on DVD in 1999, the film was also remastered for this release.

External links 
 IMDb page

1986 films
1986 drama films
Films based on Kidnapped (novel)
1980s Australian animated films
1980s English-language films